Robert Alan Elliott (born August 18, 1955) is a retired American basketball player. Elliott was a three-time academic and athletic All-American at the University of Arizona, leading his team to a Western Athletic Conference championship and two NCAA tournament appearances. He was a 1977 Third Team All American, a 1975, 1976 and 1977 Third Team All-WAC conference honoree, and a 1975, 1976, and 1977 Academic All American. Elliott received a bachelor of science in accounting, and later, an MBA from the University of Arizona as well. He is a past chairman of the Retired NBA Players Association.

University of Arizona basketball 
Elliott came to the University of Arizona from Pioneer High School in Ann Arbor, Michigan. Many Arizona basketball advocates credit the young Elliott for introducing modern Arizona basketball to the nation under the coaching style of Fred "The Fox" Snowden (the first black head basketball coach in D1 collegiate basketball). At a time when UCLA was the west coast powerhouse athletic program, Tucson worked to move from being a small "Old Pueblo" town with a great university to the U of A metropolis that it is today. Sold-out games and revenue from the Snowden Era put basketball in the spotlight. Elliott was described as having "one of the best drop steps you will ever see." He had an 18.6 career scoring average while in college between 1973–1977. He is still second, behind Sean Elliott, on the University of Arizona's all time records list with 2,131 points, field goals (808), attempted field goals (1,512), free throws (515), and attempted free throws (767). He scored 39 points against Utah in 1977, which is noted as the fourth best all-time single game performance at U of A.

NBA career
Elliott was drafted by the Philadelphia 76ers of the NBA, but never played for them. He spent half a year playing basketball in Europe and three seasons with the New Jersey Nets. Following his NBA career, Elliott briefly played for the Detroit Spirits of the Continental Basketball Association during the 1982–83 season.

EA Sports
Elliott may be best known in younger generations for his voice work as a color-commentator on NBA Live games with late sportscaster (and former Memphis Grizzlies announcer) Don Poier from 1999 to 2003.

Community involvement
Elliott is involved with multiple charities and has established a scholarship in the names of him and his wife through the University of Arizona. He is an avid musician and plays at national events with the NBA Retired Players Association Band, which is closely linked with NBA Cares events. His wife is an involved and accredited member of the Tucson Unified School District and Behind The Bench (Retired Players Wives Association), has national counseling awards and multiple degrees, and also stays active in community groups and community relations groups.

Author of "Tucson A Basketball Town" 
Released on February 26, 2014, this book is the story of the foundations of basketball at The University of Arizona during the Fred Snowden era. Co-written by Elliott's teammate and former NBA player Eric Money, it discusses the rise of basketball's popularity, being the first team to play in McKale center, the racial barriers that were broken, and the undying support of Tucson for the players. The book also pays homage to the Arizona basketball teams of the pre-Snowden era, through Lute Olson, and into Sean Miller.

Personal life 
Elliott currently resides in Tucson, Arizona. He and his wife Beverely have four adult children and ten grandchildren. Elliott also owns a successful accounting practice, Elliott Accounting Group, in Tucson that has been active for over 30 years.

See also
List of NCAA Division I men's basketball players with 2000 points and 1000 rebounds

References

External links
Bob Elliott biography at Pioneer Athletics website
Career stats at NBA.com
Bob Elliott NBA career statistics

1955 births
Living people
African-American basketball players
American expatriate basketball people in Italy
American men's basketball players
Arizona Wildcats men's basketball players
Basketball players from Ann Arbor, Michigan
Centers (basketball)
Detroit Spirits players
National Basketball Association broadcasters
New Jersey Nets players
Philadelphia 76ers draft picks
Power forwards (basketball)
21st-century African-American people
20th-century African-American sportspeople